William Sands Cox (1802 in Birmingham – 23 December 1875 in Kenilworth) was a surgeon in Birmingham, England. He founded Birmingham's first medical school in 1825  as a residential Anglican-based college in Temple Row, where a blue plaque commemorates him on the House of Fraser department store, and in Brittle Street (now obliterated by Snow Hill station). Cox went on to found the Queen's Hospital in Bath Row (Drury & Bateman, opened 1841) as a practical resource for his medical students.

The Birmingham School of Medicine and Surgery became the Birmingham Royal School of Medicine and Surgery in 1836 and then the Queen's College in 1843 by Royal Charter. Cox's ambition was for the college to teach arts, law, engineering, architecture and general science as well as medicine, surgery and theology. However, after a major split in the organisation, the non-theological departments moved off into Mason Science College which later became the University of Birmingham leaving the name Queen's College as a theological institution.

An archive collection of Cox's papers is held at the Cadbury Research Library, University of Birmingham.

See also
Queen's College, Birmingham (historical)
Queen's College, Edgbaston (current theological college)
University of Birmingham Medical School

Notes

References
A History of the County of Warwick, Volume 7 – The City of Birmingham, ed W. B. Stephens, University of London Institute of Historical Research, Oxford University Press, 1964
The Making of Birmingham: Being a History of the Rise and Growth of the Midland Metropolis, Robert K. Dent, Published by J. L. Allday, 1894 
Men of the Time, 1875

Further reading
 History of the University of Birmingham Medical School, 1825 - 2001

External links
 

English surgeons
History of Birmingham, West Midlands
1802 births
1875 deaths
Fellows of the Royal Society
Academics of the University of Birmingham